Lizard is the English name of Russian record label Ящерица which is based and founded in Moscow, Russia.

History
After Dmitry Koldun's successful performance in the Eurovision Song Contest 2007, there were arguments over who would become Koldun's producer.

Koldun is now his own producer and the album release has been postponed again. In 2009 Koldun founded his own label with Alexander Astashenok (a Russian musician, member of Russian band Корни (Roots)) named Lizard (Ящерица or Yasheritsa in Russian).

Artists

Active
 Dmitry Koldun

Discography
 Колдун

References

External links
 
Koldun's official website
 Official forum (Koldun)(Rus)
 Unofficial forum (Koldun)(Eng)

Russian record labels
Record labels established in 2009